Natuashish Airport  is  west of Natuashish, Newfoundland and Labrador, Canada.

Airlines and destinations

References

Certified airports in Newfoundland and Labrador